Essig is a village in the municipality of Swisttal in Rhein-Sieg district in the German state of North Rhine-Westphalia. It is situated approximately 18 km southwest of Bonn. In 2007 it had a population of 428.
The village hall of the municipality of Swisttal is located between Essig and its neighbouring village, Ludendorf.

References

External links
 Website of the municipality Swisttal (German)

Towns in North Rhine-Westphalia